Gilberto Teodoro Sr. (May 7, 1927 – February 22, 2008) was a former Social Security System administrator.

Early life
Gilberto O. Teodoro Sr. was born on May 7, 1927.

Personal life
Gilbert Teodoro Sr. was father of Defense Secretary Gilberto Teodoro Jr., is also survived by his wife and former Batasang Pambansa member Mercedes Cojuangco-Teodoro, daughter-in-law Representative Monica Prieto-Teodoro and grandson Jaime Gilberto.

Accomplishments
Teodoro was administrator from January 1966 to February 1986, the longest to serve as head of the SSS, which was established in 1957.

The agency was young when Teodoro became its head, and that most of the programs he initiated became the blueprint for SSS’ success.

Under Teodoro’s leadership the agency was able to launch the Educational Loan, Calamity Loan, Investment Incentive Loan Program, Small-and Medium Scale Industries Loan Program, Study-Now-Pay-Later Plan and the three-month salary loan program.

He also supervised the decentralization process of SSS operations, which speeded up processing of loans and benefits, and increased registration of wage earners and employers especially in rural areas.

The decentralization move had also allowed members to remit payments through authorized banks.

Before the decentralization, members sent payments and membership applications through mail, or appear in person at the SSS head office in Diliman, Quezon City, a costly and time-consuming process especially for members from the provinces.

Teodoro first implemented SSS Medical Care (Medicare) program in 1972, which provided cash payments for medical, surgical and hospitalization expenses of members and their beneficiaries.

Three years later, he launched the Employees’ Compensation (EC) program, which gave additional funds to members who suffered from work-related illnesses, disabilities and even death.

The administration of the Medicare program was transferred to the Philippine Health Insurance Corporation in 1995, but the SSS has continued to provide EC benefits to members.

Also under Teodoro’s leadership, the SSS started granting funeral and maternity benefits and survivors and dependents pension in the 1970s. In 1973, SSS coverage was extended to overseas Filipino workers and in 1980 to self-employed persons.

SSS investment income during Teodoro’s term enabled the fund to increase benefits several times over despite a slow increase in contribution rates.

Moreover, SSS fund placements in various government banking institutions had yielded high returns, which helped spur economic growth and fund public infrastructure projects.

Death
In a statement, the SSS News Service said that Teodoro died at 4:45 a.m. at the Makati Medical Center due to a lingering illness on February 22, 2008.

Called by some people as “Mr SSS," Teodoro has left and indelible mark on the lives of Filipino workers, said SSS president Corazon de la Paz-Bernardo.

“He left fond memories among employees in the institution and was known for maintaining a disciplined work force and for how he protected SSS form political influences," Bernardo said.

According to SSS executive vice president for operations Horacio Templo, “(Teodoro’s) term was characterized by honesty, hard work, self-sacrifice and excellence."

He was interred on February 26, 2008, at the Libingan ng mga Bayani in Taguig.

In Tarlac Agricultural University (TAU) gymnasium was named after him "Gilberto O. Teodoro Multi - purpose center" and formerly Camiling District Hospital to "Gilberto O. Teodoro Memorial Hospital"

References

1927 births
2008 deaths
20th-century Filipino economists
Cojuangco family
Burials at the Libingan ng mga Bayani